Glipostenoda melanocephala is a species of beetle in the genus Glipostenoda. It was described in 1952.

References

melanocephala
Beetles described in 1952